The common newtonia (Newtonia brunneicauda) is a species of bird in the family Vangidae. It is endemic to Madagascar.

Its natural habitats are subtropical or tropical dry forests and subtropical or tropical moist lowland forests.

It is a small bird with greyish-brown upper parts, tannish-white underparts, a black bill and golden-yellow eyes.

Taxonomy and systematics 
There are two subspecies of the common newtonia:

Newtonia brunneicauda brunneicauda, Newton 1863- It is found in forested regions throughout Madagascar. Newtonia brunneicauda inornata is considered to be a synonym.

Newtonia brunneicauda monticola, Salomonsen 1934- It is found in the Ankaratra mountains of central Madagascar.

Description 
It is a small, short-winged, warbler like bird with relatively long legs. It is 12 cm in length and weighs 7–14.5 g, with a wing length of 54.5 mm. Sexes look similar to each other. It has grayish brown upperparts and is pale warm buff in colour under. The nominate species has a cold grayish brown head and upperparts, with the sides of head and neck being a lighter grayish-brown. Its tail is also grayish brown, with off-white undertail coverts. They also have very pale yellow irises with a slender, short, and black bill. The lining of the mouth is yellow. Its tarsi are pale pinkish to grayish brown.

Juveniles look similar to adults, but have browner upperparts, with rufous-brown tips on greater wing coverts and a ginger tinge on their tertials. Irises are darker than in adults.

Ecology and behaviour

Diet 
It is insectivorous.

Distribution and habitat 
The species is found throughout Madagascar, from sea level up until an elevation of 2,300 m. It is found through a variety of forests and wooded habitats, but is mostly restricted to native forest.

References

common newtonia
common newtonia
Taxonomy articles created by Polbot